Frédéric Jalton (born 21 February 1924 in Les Abymes, Guadeloupe; died 19 November 1995) was a politician from Guadeloupe who served in the French National Assembly from 1973-1995 .

References  
Frédéric Jalton page on the French National Assembly website

1924 births
1995 deaths
People from Les Abymes
Guadeloupean politicians
Socialist Party (France) politicians
Deputies of the 5th National Assembly of the French Fifth Republic
Deputies of the 7th National Assembly of the French Fifth Republic
Deputies of the 8th National Assembly of the French Fifth Republic
Deputies of the 9th National Assembly of the French Fifth Republic
Deputies of the 10th National Assembly of the French Fifth Republic